William B. Magnarelli (born March 20, 1949) is a member of the New York State Assembly, for the 129th district first elected in 1998. He is a Democrat.

Magnarelli represents the 129th Assembly District, which includes the Northside, Westside, Eastwood and Valley areas of the City of Syracuse, as well as the towns of Geddes and Van Buren. In 1998, he won the election for an open seat.

Early life, education, and military service
Magnarelli grew up in Syracuse, attended Our Lady of Pompei School and St. John the Baptist Academy. He received his bachelor's degree from Syracuse University in 1970, majoring in history. He attended Syracuse University Law School, graduating with honors in 1973. After graduating, Bill Magnarelli served in the U.S. Army Reserve for six years, attaining the rank of captain.

External links
New York State Assembly Member Website

References

1949 births
21st-century American politicians
Lawyers from Syracuse, New York
Living people
Democratic Party members of the New York State Assembly
Politicians from Syracuse, New York
Syracuse University College of Law alumni
American people of Italian descent
Syracuse University College of Arts and Sciences alumni